The OFC U-20 Championship 1988 was held in Suva, Fiji. It also served as qualification for the intercontinental play-offs for the 1989 FIFA World Youth Championship.

Teams
The following teams entered the tournament:

 
  (host)

Group stage

Group 1

Group 2

Semifinals

Third place match

Final

Qualification to World Youth Championship
Australia and New Zealand both failed to qualify for the 1989 FIFA World Youth Championship. They finished 3rd and 4th in an intercontinental play-off group with Syria and Qatar. All matches were played in Aleppo, Syria.

External links
Results by RSSSF

1988
Under 20
1988
1988 in Fijian sport
1988 in New Zealand association football
1988 in Australian soccer
1988 in Taiwanese football
1988 in youth association football